Lincoln/1st Avenue station and Lincoln/Central Avenue station is a pair of under-construction light rail stations on the Valley Metro Rail in Phoenix, Arizona, United States. Built as part of the South Central Extension, it located on 1st Avenue and Central Avenue near the intersection of Lincoln Street. The station is expected to open in 2024.

References

Valley Metro Rail stations in Phoenix, Arizona
Railway stations scheduled to open in 2024
Railway stations under construction in the United States
Future Valley Metro Rail stations